Yuval Delshad is an Israeli film director of Iranian descent. He gained popularity in 2015 for directing Baba Joon, "the first Persian-language Israeli film". The film was screened in the Contemporary World Cinema section of the 2015 Toronto International Film Festival. At the 2015 Ophir Awards, the film won the award for the Best Film. After these initial successes, the film became Israel's entry for the Best Foreign Language Film at the 88th Academy Awards.

Filmography
 Judith: A Story of a Convert (2001)
 Regards from the War (2013)
 Baba Joon (2015)

See also
 Cinema of Israel
 List of submissions to the 88th Academy Awards for Best Foreign Language Film
 List of Israeli submissions for the Academy Award for Best Foreign Language Film

References

External links
 Live With Suzi - Interview With Navid Negahban and Yuval Delshad

Israeli film directors
Iranian Jews
Living people
Year of birth missing (living people)